Dean may refer to:

People 
 Dean (given name)
 Dean (surname), a surname of Anglo-Saxon English origin
 Dean (South Korean singer), a stage name for singer Kwon Hyuk
 Dean Delannoit, a Belgian singer most known by the mononym Dean

Titles
 Dean (Christianity), persons in certain positions of authority within a religious hierarchy
 Dean (education), persons in certain positions of authority in some educational establishments
 Dean of the Diplomatic Corps, most senior ambassador in a country's diplomatic corps
 Dean of the House, the most senior member of a country's legislature

Places
 Dean, Victoria, Australia
 Dean, Nova Scotia, Canada
 De'an County, Jiujiang, Jiangxi, China

United Kingdom
 Dean, Bedfordshire, England
 Dean, Cumbria, England
 Dean, Lynton and Lynemouth, a location in Devon
 Dean, Trentishoe, a location
 Dean, Dorset, a location
 Dean, Bishops Waltham, a location in Hampshire
 Dean, Sparsholt, a location in Hampshire
 Dean, Lancashire, a location
 Dean, Oxfordshire, England
 Dean, Somerset, a hamlet in Cranmore, England
 Dean Village, Edinburgh, Scotland
 Forest of Dean, Gloucestershire, England
 Dene (valley) common toponym in England often rendered 'dean' in place names

United States
 Dean, California, an unincorporated community
 Dean, Iowa, an unincorporated community
 Dean, Nevada, ghost town
 Dean, Pennsylvania, a borough
 Dean, Texas, a city

Other
 Dean (film), a 2016 American film starring Demetri Martin
 Dean College, a private college in Franklin, Massachusetts
 Dean Foods, a dairy processor in Dallas, Texas
 Dean Guitars, American manufacturer of guitars and other stringed instruments
 Dean number, a dimensionless group in fluid mechanics, which occurs in the study of flow in curved pipes and channels
 Hurricane Dean, 2007 Atlantic hurricane
 USS Dean II (SP-98), a United States Navy patrol boat in commission from 1917 to 1918

See also
 Deane (disambiguation)
 Justice Dean (disambiguation)